Olga Valerievna Ponizova (born March 8, 1974, Moscow) is a Russian theater and film actress.

Biography 
In 1995 she graduated from the Boris Shchukin Theatre Institute (workshop Alla Kazanskaya). There was a theater actress Moon Theater  and Moscow Theater of Young Spectators.

Personal life 
She was married to TV presenter and television director Andrey Chelyadinov. In 1995 the couple had a son Nikita (died in an accident July 3, 2015).

Filmography 
1989 — Do Not   Get Along as Panteleyeva
1993 — Sin. The Story of Passion as Nina
 1995 — Everything Will Be Fine!  as Olya
 1998 —   Waiting Room as Irina Sokolova  
 2002 — Bandit Petersburg: The Collapse of Antibiotic as Dasha
 2002 — Two Fates as Svetlana
2002 — Landscape with Murder as Ksenia
2002 — Zazhigayka  as Liza
2003 — I Decide Eerything Myself: Dancing on the Waves as Inna Malakhova
 2003 — I Decide Everything Myself 2: The Voice of the Heart as  Inna Malakhova
2005 — Happy New Year, Papa! as Katya
2005 — Two Fates 2 as Svetlana Yusupova
2005 — Adventuress as Tanya Savicheva
2006 — On the Corner, at the Patriarch Ponds 4 as Anna
2007 — A Dozen of Justice as Zhanna Taranova
2007 — You'll Always Be with Me as Tamara

References

External links 
 
 Ольга ПОНИЗОВА
 Ольга Понизова: «Сын — главное, что у меня есть»

1974 births
Living people
Soviet film actresses
Russian film actresses
Russian television actresses
Russian stage actresses
Actresses from Moscow
Soviet child actresses